Rufirallus is a genus of birds in the family Rallidae.

It contains the following species:

 Russet-crowned crake, Rufirallus viridis
 Chestnut-headed crake, Rufirallus castaneiceps

References

 
Bird genera
Taxa named by Charles Lucien Bonaparte